Erlangea alternifolia is an annual herb within the Asteraceae family. It occurs in Tanzania and Kenya.

Description 
An annual herb, it grows up to 180 cm, with a variability between 23-180 cm in height. Leaves are elliptic to obovate in outline and the apex is obtuse to rounded, base is cuneate or attenuate. Inflorescence is capitulum with a cyme that is terminal and corymbiform like, a receptacle that is concave in outline, and phyllaries that are narrowly ovate, up to 8 mm long. Flowers: corolla is purple colored, lobes range is between 2.3-2.5 mm long, the corolla has multicellular purple like hairs at the apex.

References

Flora of Kenya
Flora of Tanzania
Flora of East Tropical Africa
Vernonieae